The Bare-Footed Kid (released in the Philippines as Professional Fighter) is a 1993 Hong Kong martial arts film directed by Johnnie To and starring Aaron Kwok, Maggie Cheung, Ti Lung and Jacklyn Wu. The film is a remake of the 1975 film, Disciples of Shaolin, which was directed by Chang Cheh.

Plot
After the death of his father, the poor and illiterate Kwan Fung-yiu (Aaron Kwok) goes out to the provincial capital to seek refuge from Tuen Ching-wan (Ti Lung), a friend of his deceased father, and works in a dye factory, the "Four Seasons Weaver". The political situation in the capital is tense. With his superior identity as a Manchurian, Hak Wo-po (Kenneth Tsang), owner of the "Tin Lung Spinner", dominates the city and set up a gambling den where he sends his workers to fight with workers of "Four Seasons Weave". The newly appointed magistrate Yuen Tin-yau (Cheung Siu-fai) and his instructor Mr. Wah (Paul Chun) want to eradicate Hak, but they do not have enough evidence to bring him to justice. Later, Tin-yau meets Pak Siu-kwan (Maggie Cheung), the owner of "Four Seasons Weaver" and Wah's daughter Lin (Jacklyn Wu). Then it was revealed that Tuen was a fugitive who changed his name and hid in the dye factory to avoid arrest and developed affection towards Pak. Fung-yiu and Lin also develops a mutual bond after an incident.

"Tin Lung Spinners" had always been inferior to "Four Seasons Weaver". Feeling vengeful, Hak sets "Four Seasons Weave" on fire to vent his anger. Fung-yiu, who is witless, dazed and confused, gets up to the fighting arena, and was lured by Hak where he kills his friend's father. Fung-yiu had fallen further and further into a quagmire of confusion. He also reveals Tuen's past identity as a killer and Tuen is wanted by officials. Yuen Tin-yau's discerning eyes can tell greatness from Fung-yiu, and they work together to defeat the "Dragon Place". However, Tuen was ambushed by Hak where he swallowed poison and shot to death by millions of arrows. Fung-yiu hurried off to save Tuen, but it was too late by then.

Cast
Aaron Kwok as Kwan Fung-yiu
Ti Lung as Tuen Ching-wan
Maggie Cheung as Pak Siu-kwan
Jacklyn Wu as Wah Wong-lin
Paul Chun as Mr. Wah
Kenneth Tsang as Hak Wo-po
Cheung Siu-fai as Magistrate Yuen Tin-yau
Wong Yat-fei as Kuei
Tin Ching as Pak's worker
Wong San as Pak's indebted worker
Chu Tit-wo as Hung Chun-tin
Benny Lai as City guard
Johnny Cheng as City guard
Yuen Ling-to as Pui
Cheng Ka-sang as Hak's bodyguard
Leung Kai-chi as Weaver at Tin Lung Spinners
Hau Woon-ling as Sam Ku, woman leading bridal march
Jacky Cheung Chun-hung as Magistrate Yuen's aide
So Wai-nam as Magistrate Yuen's aide
Kent Chow as Magistrate Yuen's aide
Kong Miu-deng as Hak's thug
Mak Wai-cheung as Hak's thug
Huang Kai-sen as Hak's thug
Chan Min-leung as Chan
Chan Man-hiu as Shoes vendor
Ng Wui as Cow owner
Kam Lau as Shop owner
San Tak-kan as Boat passenger
Kai Cheung-lung as Boatman
Adam Chan
Kwan Yung
Jameson Lam

Music

Theme song
The Expression After Speaking (留下句號的面容)
Composer: William Wu
Lyricist: Siu Mei
Singer: Aaron Kwok

Insert theme
Wait for Your Return (等你回來)
Composer: William Wu
Lyricist: Siu Mei
Singer: Cass Phang

Release
The Bare-Footed Kid was released in Hong Kong on 3 April 1993. In the Philippines, the film was released as Professional Fighter by South Cinema Films on 21 April 1994, with actor Aaron Kwok credited as "Alexander Fu Sheng Jr."

Critical response
The Bare-Footed Kid received generally positive reviews. Ard Vijn of Twitch Film writes "it's not a classic by any means but it's a fun movie that definitely has its moments. Fans of either Aaron Kwok, Ti Lung or Maggie Cheung won't be disappointed." Mark Polland of Kung Fu Cinema rated it 4 out of 5 stars and writes The Bare-Footed Kid is a thoughtful kung fu film with an unusually strong story that winningly delivers a message that strength and fighting ability are useless without morality and sound judgment. Andrew Saroch of Far East Films also rated film 4 out of 5 stars and writes "while not as good as Disciples of Shaolin, Bare-Footed Kid is an excellent film and like its inspiration, operates of a number of levels."

Box office
The film grossed HK$3,973,198 at the Hong Kong box office during its theatrical run from 3 to 14 April 1993.

See also
Aaron Kwok filmography
Johnnie To filmography

References

External links

The Bare-Footed Kid at Hong Kong Cinemagic

1993 films
1993 action films
1993 martial arts films
Hong Kong action films
Hong Kong martial arts films
Kung fu films
1990s Cantonese-language films
Films directed by Johnnie To
Remakes of Hong Kong films
Films set in the Qing dynasty
Films with screenplays by Yau Nai-hoi
1990s Hong Kong films